Sir Patrick Coll (1839–1917), KCB, PC was an Irish lawyer. He was the Chief Crown Solicitor for Ireland from 1888 to 1905.

References 

 "Sir Patrick Coll", The Times, 13 March 1917, p. 9.

Notes

1839 births
1917 deaths
Knights Bachelor
Knights Commander of the Order of the Bath
Members of the Privy Council of Ireland
Irish solicitors